Arf-GAP with dual PH domain-containing protein 1 is a protein that in humans is encoded by the ADAP1 gene.

Interactions 

Centaurin, alpha 1 has been shown to interact with:

 Casein kinase 1, alpha 1 
 Nucleolin, 
 P110α, 
 PRKCI, 
 Protein kinase D1,  and
 Protein kinase Mζ.

Model organisms
Model organisms have been used in the study of ADAP1 function. A conditional knockout mouse line called Adap1tm1a(EUCOMM)Wtsi was generated at the Wellcome Trust Sanger Institute. Male and female animals underwent a standardized phenotypic screen to determine the effects of deletion. Additional screens performed:  
 In-depth immunological phenotyping 
 in-depth bone and cartilage phenotyping

References

Further reading 

 
 
 
 
 
 
 
 
 
 
 
 
 
 
 
 

Proteins